The Fabulous Beekman Boys was a reality television show produced in the United States by World of Wonder Productions. The series followed Josh Kilmer-Purcell and his husband Brent Ridge as they learned how to become farmers and launch their lifestyle brand, Beekman 1802. Brent, a physician who previously worked for Martha Stewart Omnimedia, lives at the farm full-time, while Josh, a New York Times bestselling author, commutes from their apartment in New York City on the weekends. The show originally aired on Planet Green, one of the Discovery Networks, but was acquired by Cooking Channel, a network owned by Scripps Network Interactive in 2012.

Touted as a "gay Green Acres", the series chronicled the couple's trials and tribulations as novice farmers, aided by their caretaker and resident farmer John Hall, or "Farmer John." Hall brought his goats to the Beekman Farm shortly after Ridge and Kilmer-Purcell purchased it in 2007. Also featured is Polka Spot, the farm's llama. Other residents of Sharon Springs, New York are also included in the cast, including Doug Plummer and Garth Roberts, owners of the American Hotel.

On August 9, 2010, Planet Green announced that The Fabulous Beekman Boys had been renewed for a second season of ten episodes. In announcing the renewal, Laura Michalchyshyn, President and General Manager of Planet Green, noted that the series "has quickly established itself as a cornerstone franchise for Planet Green". The second season began on March 22, 2011.

Planet Green declined to renew The Fabulous Beekman Boys for a third season based on low ratings. However, Cooking Channel announced in April 2012 that it had picked up the series for a third season, although it still remained unknown as of 2023. The channel plans to repeat the first two seasons with additional footage as well.  The pair also participated in the 21st season of The Amazing Race, ultimately becoming the season's grand prize winners.

Overview
Season one follows what Josh and Brent call the "year of sacrifice" with Brent living full-time at the farm while Josh works in the city during the week and commutes to the farm on weekends. The season follows the couple's attempts to build their brand, including attaining wider exposure for their goat milk soaps and cheeses, and to deal with the stress that the long separation puts on their relationship. The season closes with the opening of their first store, the couple's celebration of their tenth anniversary and their agreement to extend the "year of sacrifice".

Season two opens with Josh's growing increasingly frustrated over deferring his dream to be a full-time farmer and the couple's setting a goal of generating one million dollars in revenue to allow Josh to move to Beekman Farm permanently. The supporting cast expands with the introduction of three Beekman 1802 employees: Stephane the comptroller; Megan, chief operating officer; and Maria, the director of resources.

Episodes

Season one

Season two

Critical response
The New York Times finds the show "less fabulous" than 1960s sitcom Green Acres, citing its emphasis on arguments between the couple (Brent & Josh) over "fish-out-of-water rural humor". The Times concludes that "the audience that fiercely defends all things purporting to be fabulous" will enjoy the series' "moments of sylvan burlesque".

Salon.com found Brent and Josh to be "uniquely charming" and the show a "voyeuristic treat".

References

External links
 Beekman 1802 and Beekman Farm site
 The Fabulous Beekman Boys on Cooking Channel
 The Fabulous Beekman Boys at the Internet Movie Database
 Fabulous Beekman Boys Interview

2010 American television series debuts
2011 American television series endings
2010s American LGBT-related television series
2010s American reality television series
Destination America original programming
Cooking Channel original programming
American LGBT-related reality television series
2010s LGBT-related reality television series
Television shows filmed in New York (state)
Television shows filmed in North Carolina